Adalbero or Adalberon is a masculine given name, a variant of Adalbert, derived from the Old High German words adal ("noble") and beraht ("bright") or bero ("bear"). It may refer to:

 Adalbero I of Metz (died 962), bishop
 Adalbero II of Metz (died 1005), bishop
 Adalbero (archbishop of Reims) (died 989)
 Adalberon (bishop of Laon) (died 1030/31)
 Adalbero, Duke of Carinthia (1039)
 Adalbero III of Luxembourg (1072), bishop of Metz
 Adalbero of Styria (died 1086/87), margrave
 Adalbero of Würzburg (died 1090), bishop and saint

Name day
 October 6: Saint Adalbero of Würzburg (Catholic)

See also
 Albert (given name)
 Æthelberht (disambiguation)

References

Germanic given names
Archaic words and phrases